Rodney Rowe may refer to:

Rodney Rowe (athlete) (born 1997), American sprinter
Rodney Rowe (footballer) (born 1975), English footballer